Kinrossie is a linear village in the Perth and Kinross area of Scotland.

References

Villages in Perth and Kinross